Graeme John Koehne  (born 3 August 1956), is an Australian composer and music educator. He is best known for his orchestral and ballet scores, which are characterised by direct communicative style and embrace of tertian harmony. His orchestral trilogy Unchained Melody, Powerhouse, and Elevator Music makes allusions to Hollywood film score traditions, cartoon music, popular Latin music and other dance forms.

Life and career
Koehne was born in Adelaide. He completed his undergraduate and post-graduate studies at the Elder Conservatorium of Music in that city, studying composition with Richard Meale – a pupil of Winifred Burston, who had been a pupil of Ferruccio Busoni.

In 1982 he won the Young Composers Prize at that year's Adelaide Festival, gaining him national attention for his orchestral work Rainforest.  In 1984, Koehne was awarded a Harkness Fellowship to work at the School of Music, Yale University. Here he studied with Louis Andriessen and Jacob Druckman. For two years of the fellowship he also took private lessons with Virgil Thomson.

He returned to Australia in 1986 and was appointed Lecturer in Composition at the Elder Conservatorium of Music. In the early 1990s he collaborated with librettist Louis Nowra on the chamber opera Love Burns, which was premiered at the 1992 Adelaide Festival. Around this time, he commenced his long and fruitful collaboration with choreographer Graeme Murphy, which included a children's ballet based on Oscar Wilde's The Selfish Giant and the full-length work Nearly Beloved.

As of 2005, Koehne is Head of Composition at the Elder Conservatorium of Music. Until recently he also chaired the Music Board of the Australia Council and was a board member of the council.

Graeme is married to former model, now advertising Creative Director of Oranje Creative, Melinda Parent. Graeme and Melinda have one son Willem Lukas Christiaan (Born 2007).

Works
Ballets
Nearly Beloved (1986; Sydney Dance Company)
Nocturnes, 1914 (The Australian Ballet)
The Selfish Giant (1983; Sydney Dance Company)
Tivoli (2001; Sydney Dance Company/The Australian Ballet co-production)

Chamber music
String Quartet
To His Servant Bach God Grants a Final Glimpse – The Morning Star (1989; also transcribed as organ trio). The work references Spitta's Johann Sebastian Bach: "...so that Bach was henceforth totally blind... On July 18 he suddenly found his eyesight restored, and could bear daylight; but this was life's parting greeting...he died on Tuesday, July 28, 1750..."

Concertos
InFlight Entertainment (2000, oboe concerto)

Orchestral
Rainforest (c. 1982)
Unchained Melody (1991)
Powerhouse (1993)
Elevator Music (1997)
Way Out West (2000)
Sleep of Reason (2008)
Song of the Open Road (2017)

Albums

Honours and awards
In 2001, Koehne was awarded the Centenary Medal. 

In the 2014 Queen's Birthday Honours List, Koehne was appointed as an Officer of the Order of Australia (AO), "for distinguished service to the performing arts as a composer of chamber, concert and ballet music, and through substantial contributions as an educator and arts administrator."

APRA Awards
The APRA Awards are held in Australia and New Zealand by the Australasian Performing Right Association to recognise songwriting skills, sales and airplay performance by its members annually.

! 
|-
|rowspan="2"| 2009 || Tivoli Dances ||rowspan="2"| Orchestral Work of the Year ||  ||rowspan="2"| 
|-
| Palm Court Suite ||  
|-

Bernard Heinze Memorial Award
The Sir Bernard Heinze Memorial Award is given to a person who has made an outstanding contribution to music in Australia.

! 
|-
| 2003 || Graeme Koehne|| Sir Bernard Heinze Memorial Award ||  || <
|-

References
Notes

Sources
Bebbington, W. (ed.) (1997), The Oxford Companion to Australian Music, Melbourne, Oxford University Press, pp. 324–325.
Kennedy, Michael (2006), The Oxford Dictionary of Music, 985 pages, 
Williams, L. (1988) "Emerging Australian Composers", The Musical Times, Vol. 129, No. 1749. (Nov. 1988), pp. 591–594.

External links
Graeme Koehne: Represented Artist, profile at the Australian Music Centre
Elder Conservatorium, Graeme Koehne: Professor of Composition, contact details

1956 births
Living people
20th-century classical composers
21st-century classical composers
APRA Award winners
Australian male classical composers
Australian music educators
Ballet composers
Harkness Fellows
Musicians from Adelaide
Pupils of Jacob Druckman
Pupils of Louis Andriessen
Officers of the Order of Australia
Recipients of the Centenary Medal
University of Adelaide alumni
Yale University alumni
20th-century Australian male musicians
20th-century Australian musicians
21st-century Australian male musicians
21st-century Australian musicians